is a Japanese light novel series written by Yūji Hayami and illustrated by Kiyotaka Haimura. The first novel was released on April 15, 2006, and as of July 15, 2009, nine volumes have been published by SoftBank Creative under their GA Bunko imprint.

A manga adaptation by Michiko Usami was serialized on Flex Comix's free web comic FlexComix Blood and FlexComix Next. A TV drama adaptation aired in July 2009 on TV Asahi.

TV series
Maid Deka was broadcast on TV Asahi in 11 episodes from June 26 to September 11, 2009. The series starred Saki Fukuda as maid Aoi Wakatsuki  who is actually an undercover detective sent to investigate crimes at wealthy estates. The official English title is Housemaid Cop.

Cast
 Saki Fukuda as Aoi Wakatsuki
 Ryuuji Harada as Inspector Toshiaki Kaido
 Koji Matoba as Masaharu Kaji
 Yoko Oshima as Sakura Tsubouchi
 Toru Shinagawa as Asakusa
 Megumi Nakayama as Reiko Momose
 Reon Kadena as Yoko Ito

References

External links 
  
 FlexComix Blood's Website for Maid Deka 
 FlexComix Next's Website for Maid Deka 
  
 

2006 Japanese novels
2007 manga
Action anime and manga
FlexComix Blood and FlexComix Next manga
GA Bunko
Japanese drama television series
Japanese webcomics
Light novels
Seinen manga
Shōnen manga
TV Asahi television dramas
Webcomics in print